UniKey Technologies is an alternative access control company based in the United States that designs and licenses keyless entry technology worldwide. Its first product in partnership with Kwikset is Kēvo, a Bluetooth-enabled deadbolt door lock.

History
UniKey Technologies was founded in 2010 in Florida by Phil Dumas, who serves as president and chief executive officer. He has an electrical engineering degree from the University of Central Florida and a background in biometric security. Dumas was part of the team that launched SmartScan, the first mass-market biometric residential deadbolt lock. He started UniKey in an effort to create a more dependable and convenient way to access everything.

UniKey Technologies first came to the public's attention in May 2012, when Dumas appeared on ABC's reality series Shark Tank. UniKey received investment offers from all five judges on the show, including an offer of $500,000 for a 40% equity stake from Mark Cuban and Kevin O'Leary. Dumas accepted the offer, but they ultimately were unable to come to terms after the show. By 2013, UniKey had raised approximately $2.6 million in funding, led by ff Venture Capital. That year, UniKey announced a licensing deal with Kwikset, the largest residential lock manufacturer in the United States and one of the largest in the world, to manufacture and distribute Kēvo, a residential smart lock using UniKey's technology.

Products
Launched in 2013, Kēvo is the first Bluetooth-enabled touch-to-open smart lock. Kēvo has the ability to detect a user's compatible smartphone or tablet (via an app) to lock and unlock the door. The deadbolt lock senses when the user's phone is nearby and when it's outside; the phone emits a low-energy Bluetooth signal, allowing the door to be unlocked when the lock face is touched, making it unnecessary to interact with the phone in order to open the door. Users can grant unrestricted or temporary access to other phones as well. Kēvo also comes with a keychain fob that provides the same touch-to-open function as an authorized smart phone. A prime security feature of the product is UniKey's Inside/Outside Intelligence, which detects whether a verified device is currently inside or outside the home. If an authorized device is known to be inside the house, unauthorized users are unable to activate Kēvo from outside. The system acts as a one-way filter that lets only authorized users pass through the entryway.

Partnerships
In June 2014, UniKey and MIWA Lock Company announced a partnership to offer keyless entry to hotels. UniKey has developed a touch-to-open passive keyless entry system to be integrated into MIWA's existing radio-frequency identification hospitality locks. The keys are activated through smartphone apps. When guests check in through the app, they are sent their room number and the phone is enabled to act as a virtual key. Following the MIWA partnership, UniKey is making its way into the commercial access control industry through partnerships with Grosvenor Technologies and Nortek Security & Control. The company has also expanded its international reach with a partnership with UK home security company ERA.

Milestones

References

External links
 

American companies established in 2010
Access control
Technology companies of the United States
2010 establishments in Florida